Barzini is a surname.

People
Notable people with the surname include:
 Benedetta Barzini (born 1943), Italian actress and model

 Matteo Barzini (born 1981), Italian filmmaker and producer

Fictional characters
 Emilio Barzini, a fictional character and the main antagonist in Mario Puzo's novel The Godfather and its film adaptation